Maria Rain is a town in the district of Klagenfurt-Land in the Austrian state of Carinthia, known for its Baroque parish and pilgrimage church (rebuilt between 1700 and 1729).

Geography
Maria Rain lies in the Rosental, 8 km south of Klagenfurt between the Sattnitz massif and the Drau, which is dammed here to form the Ferlach Reservoir.

Population
According to the 2001 census 3.9% of the population are Carinthian Slovenes.

References

Cities and towns in Klagenfurt-Land District